The Hollywood Sun-Tattler was a daily newspaper serving Hollywood and southern Broward County, Florida.

The Hollywood Sun-Tattler'''s story began with the 1932 publication of its predecessor, the South Broward Tattler. In 1935 the Hollywood Sun was established as a competing weekly.  In 1942 it was combined with the South Broward Tattler and the Hollywood News'' (established in 1924), whereupon it adopted the Hollywood Sun-Tattler name it would use for most of its history.  The first owner of the publication was Wallace Stevens, who owned until its acquisition by the E. W. Scripps Company in 1965. In 1989 it was purchased again and reverted to the Hollywood Sun name used by the original predecessor publication.

In December 1991, the paper, which as of 1989 had had a circulation of 31,000, ceased operation.

References

External links 
 Hollywood Sun-Tattler Collection, fully digitized by the Broward County Library

Defunct newspapers published in Florida